Martin Conway may refer to:

 Martin Conway, 1st Baron Conway of Allington (1856–1937), English art critic, politician and mountaineer
 Martin Conway (author) (born 1952), English author
 Martin Conway (Irish politician) (born 1974), Irish Fine Gael Senator
 Martin F. Conway (1827–1882), U.S. politician